Fatherhood is an American animated sitcom about the Bindlebeep family, inspired by the book of the same name by Bill Cosby, which aired from 2004 to 2005.  This was Nick at Nite's first original animated series. It has aired on Nick at Nite and Nickelodeon.

Scientist Dr. Arthur Bindlebeep is the head of the family and a high school teacher. He and his wife, Norma, try to be model parents while learning a few things from their three children: Angie, Roy and Katherine and their dog Guinness. At the same time, Arthur's own parents, Lester and Louise, still have some lessons for him.

Production
Blair Underwood, who played Dr. Bindlebeep, said that he had meetings with Cosby to help find the voice of the character: "When you're a father, you have to constantly be straddling that line between being a disciplinarian and loving your kid. Sometimes we err on the side of being too friendly with our kids, and sometimes we can be too stern. And what [Cosby] was saying as a through line was, 'Make sure that whatever you're doing, whatever you're saying is coming from a place of love and that will inform the tone of the voice.'"

Voice cast
 Blair Underwood – Dr. Arthur Bindlebeep
 Sabrina Le Beauf – Norma Bindlebeep
 Giovonnie Samuels – Angie Bindlebeep
 Marc John Jefferies – Roy Bindlebeep
 Jamai Fisher – Katherine Bindlebeep

Episodes

Series overview

Season 1 (2004–05)

Season 2 (2005)

Home media
Season 1 has been released on DVD, and all episodes were available via Amazon Video until November 2014, when they were removed in response to the allegations involved in the Bill Cosby sexual assault cases. The series has since been added back.

References

External links
 
 

2000s American adult animated television series
2000s American black cartoons
2000s American black sitcoms
2004 American television series debuts
2005 American television series endings
American adult animated comedy television series
American animated sitcoms
American flash adult animated television series
English-language television shows
Nick at Nite original programming
Television shows based on books
Television series created by Bill Cosby
Animated television series about children
Animated television series about families